Hyracodon ('hyrax tooth') is an extinct genus of perissodactyl mammal.

It was a lightly built, pony-like mammal of about 1.5 m (5 ft) long. Hyracodon'''s skull was large in comparison to the rest of the body. Hyracodon's'' dentition resembled that of later rhinoceroses, but it was a much smaller animal and differed very little in appearance from the primitive horses of which it was a contemporary (32–26 million years ago). It had a short, broad snout and its long, slender limbs had three digits.

Like the primitive horses, hyracodonts inhabited open forests and wooded steppes and turned from browsing foliage to grazing grass. They died out without leaving any descendants and they mark the end of the phylogenetic branch of hornless, running rhinoceroses.

References

Sources
 

Eocene rhinoceroses
White River Fauna
Oligocene rhinoceroses
Hyracodonts
Taxa named by Joseph Leidy
Fossil taxa described in 1856